Neil El Aynaoui (born 2 July 2001) is a French professional footballer who plays as a midfielder for  club Nancy.

Career
El Aynaoui joined the youth academy of Nancy when he was 8, and signed his first professional contract with the club on 3 June 2021. He made his professional debut with Nancy in a 4–0 Ligue 2 loss to Toulouse on 31 July 2021.

Personal life
Born in France, El Aynaoui is the son of the retired Moroccan tennis player Younes El Aynaoui.

References

External links
 

2001 births
Living people
French footballers
French sportspeople of Moroccan descent
Association football midfielders
Ligue 2 players
Championnat National 3 players
AS Nancy Lorraine players